Christopher Morris (born 1958) is an American photojournalist best known for his documentary conflict photographs, being a White House photographer, a fashion photographer, and a film director.

Life and work
Morris was born in 1958 in California. In 1980, he earned a photography bachelor of science degree from the Art Institute of Fort Lauderdale. He was appointed runner by Black Star director Howard Chapnick. In 1981, during six months, he documented the underground world of the New York City Subway in a photo essay published 33 years later in Time.

War photographer
In 1983, during the civil conflict in the Philippines in Manila, Morris started covering world news as documentary conflict photographer for Newsweek.

In 1989 - 1990, he documented the United States invasion of Panama. CBS News and RAI broadcast his short movie. He won one of his first prizes World Press Photo awards for "Casualties of Just Cause, Panama."

On March 4, 1991, near the front of the Persian Gulf War, his photograph of a U.S. Marine holding the American flag above his shoulders made the front cover of Life.

During nine years, he covered the war in the former Yugoslavia. In Perpignan, his photo essay won the Visa d'Or award. However Grazia Neri wrote: "It was in Yugoslavia that the daily exposure to the war on civilians started to weigh heavily on him, on his person, on his soul, and on his photography."

In May 1992, he has been named the recipient of the 1991 Robert Capa Gold Medal for his coverage of "Slaughter in Vukovar".

About the famine in Mogadishu during the war in Somalia, he said that he did not wish to live again such an experience.

In 1995, he captured movement in a photograph of a Chechen fighter running outside of the demolished presidential palace during the battle of Grozny of the first Chechen War: "At that moment that's the most dangerous place on earth. I'm not sitting there saying, 'Oh, I'm going to shoot slow shutter speeds and I'm going to zoom it!'" Morris said. "You're just shooting."

1998 was the year of the Kosovo assignment.

In 2000, the second Chechen War was the turning point of his career of "war shooter":

In 2001, he provided coverage of the terrorism in Yemen and the 2003 invasion of Iraq.

In 2011, he documented the Libyan Civil War and, in 2012, the Plan Colombia.

Morris, who was commissioned by Black Star in 1988 to document the Soviet–Afghan War, photographed 24 years later for Time/VII the parents of the POW Bowe Bergdahl, captured in 2009 during the War in Afghanistan.

Political photographer
In 2000, in United States, as member of the White House pool, he covered the presidencies of George W. Bush and Barack Obama for Time.

In 2013, in France, he documented the presidency of François Hollande for Le Monde. For Elle, he provided coverage of the political campaign race to conquer the Paris city hall for the first time between two women: Nathalie Kosciusko-Morizet and Anne Hidalgo who both campaigned to become Mayor of Paris.

On February 29, 2016, Morris was involved in an altercation with a United States Secret Service agent while photographing a Black Lives Matter protest at a campaign rally at Radford University in Virginia. Morris cursed at the Secret Service agent moments prior to the physical confrontation. The agent grabbing the photographer's neck with both hands and threw him into a table and onto the ground. While lying on the ground, Morris kicked at the agent. Morris grabbed at the agent's neck which Morris stated was to demonstrate the choke hold he had just experienced. The Secret Service launched an investigation into the incident, a spokesman said, and would "provide further details as warranted once additional facts surrounding the situation are known."

Books
In 2006, Morris published his photographic monograph, My America, a personal journey through portraits and landscapes into a Republican America. This book of photographies was produced while on assignment for Time covering U.S. president George W. Bush and those close to him.

In 2012, Morris continued his series about the American society with his second book Americans.

Movie director
In 2007, for The New York Times, Morris directed the short film The Gentle Shepherd about the pastor Terry Fox at the Wild West World theme park in Wichita.

For Time LightBox, in 2013, Morris directed, edited and produced the short film Conclave about people waiting, in St. Peter's Square, for the announcement of the new Pope.

In 2016, he introduced a new way to film the United States presidential candidates’ rallies using a high-speed camera, his short movies being played back in slow-motion.

Fashion photographer
In 2008, his book My America is noticed by the editor in chief of the Italian fashion magazine Amica who hired him for a Ralph Lauren shooting in New York.

In 2010, he photographed Carmen Jalving
and Isabella Rossellini for Amica.

At the Tampa Bay Times Forum, he attended the 2012 Republican National Convention in Tampa for a shooting featuring Heidi Harrington Johnson in the editorial Beyond the conventions ("Au-delà des conventions") of the French magazine L'Officiel Paris, issue #970, published in November.

In 2013, Dior-clad Marta Dyks was his model during the Haute Couture shows in Paris for L'Officiel, issue #973 of March.

Portrait photographer
In 2008, Morris photographed the American rock band The Killers: Mark Stoermer, Brandon Flowers, Ronnie Vannucci, Jr., and Dave Keuning near Las Vegas.

In 2011, Monastery Girl featuring Ilaria Pozzi in Italy was a personal project.

In 2015, Laetitia Casta opened her doors for him in Lumio about the Paris Match editorial The independent ("L'indépendante"). This French language weekly news magazine quoted the name of the photographer directly in the title of an associated article, attracting the attention of readers who wished to know more about him.

Still photographer
In August 2015, on the shooting of the movie En Moi, Morris photographed the instant where the Dutch model Lara Stone is become actress for her first leading role of the woman. He captured on film the moment where the French actress Laetitia Casta is become film director for the first time. He was the witness of the metamorphosis of the Japanese actor Akaji Maro in his role of the man of service into the butoh-dancer in the Palais Garnier where the French Danseur Étoile Jérémie Bélingard interpreted the lover of the woman in front of the camera of the French film cinematographer Benoît Delhomme.

Street photographer 
In his early career, Morris often photographed candidly in urban settings, particularly in New York City. In 2014, his 1981 series from the New York Subway was published for the first time in Time. Over a six-month period that year, Morris had embedded himself in the subway system, often riding the trains alone, but other times riding with the Guardian Angels volunteer anti-crime group.

Publications
My America. Göttingen: Steidl, 2006. .
Americans. Göttingen: Steidl, 2012. .

Exhibitions
 2013: From War & Politics to Fashion, Berlin Foto-Festival

Filmography 
Short films directed by Morris:

People of Power 
 2006: The Dear Leader
 2009: Obama’s War, Obama’s Burden, The New Leader
 2011: Oval Of Power
 2016: the candidates’ rallies for Time: Bernie, Cruz, Hillary, Jeb, Marco, Trump

Religion 
In Wichita:
 2007: The Gentle Shepherd

In Rome:
 2011: Beatus
 2013: Conclave in Vatican City

Fashion 
For Amica:
 2009: Givenchy, “The Dress”
 2011: “Planet Queen” Louis Vuitton, Anastasiya Bondarenko in Chanel Couture, Dior Couture in Paris
 2011: “Deranged” Carmen in Roberto Cavalli featuring Carmen Jalving in Èze
 2012: Sasha with Sasha Melnycuck

For Time:
 2012: Can You See Her featuring Katryn Kruger, Elena Bartels, Zuanna Bijoch, Irina Nikolaeva, Aline Weber, Alex Yuryeva, Olga Sherer in Paris

For Le Monde:
 2012: “La Robe” Serkan Cura, “La Robe” Versace, Valentino’s Atelier, On Aura Tout Vu, Just Look in Paris

For InStyle UK:
 2012: “Turn Away” for Roberto Cavalli in Milan

For Fragrance Inspirations:
 2014: Phantom Portraits in slow motion in Paris

Mood 
 2010: The Black Tide off the Louisiana coast
 2011: Temporal from Arles to Nice

Awards
Morris, commissioned by Black Star, won:
 In 1990, the 2nd prize World Press Photo Award, section Spot News Series for "Casualties of Just Cause, Panama."

For Time, the two following prizes:
 In 1991, the Olivier Rebbot award.
 In 1992, the 1991 Robert Capa Gold Medal for "Slaughter in Vukovar".

His other awards included:
 In 1992, the Magazine Photographer of the Year award from Pictures of the Year International.
 The Infinity Photojournalist awards from the International Center of Photography, New York.
 The Visa d'Or award, section News for Yugoslav Wars.
 In 2004, the 2nd prize National Press Photographers Association's Best Of Photojournalism Contest, section Magazine News Picture Story.
 In 2005, the Feature photography Overseas Press Club: "Inside the Hermit Kingdom".
 The 1st prize World Press Photo Award, section: people in the stories.

See also

Notes

References

External links
Official website
VII Photo Agency Bio

American photojournalists
War photographers
1958 births
Living people
American film directors
Photographers from California
21st-century American photographers
Fashion photographers
American portrait photographers
VII Photo Agency photographers